István Sándor may refer to:

 István Sándor (martyr), Hungarian anti-communist and Roman Catholic martyr
 István Sándor (rower), Hungarian rower
 István Sándor (footballer, born 1986), Hungarian football central midfielder
 István Sándor (footballer, born 1944), Ukrainian footballer of Hungarian origin

See also
 István Sándorfi